Boban Bajković (born 15 March 1985) is a Montenegrin former professional footballer who played as a goalkeeper.

Club career
Born in Cetinje, Bajković made his first senior appearances with his hometown club Lovćen in the 2001–02 Second League of FR Yugoslavia. He later spent some time on trial at Red Star Belgrade in 2003, but returned to his parent club eventually.

In January 2004, Bajković was officially transferred to Red Star Belgrade. He subsequently went on loans to Jedinstvo Ub (2004–05), Rad (2006), Smederevo (2007), and Srem (2007). In early 2008, Bajković returned to Red Star and made his first competitive appearances for the club in the 2007–08 Serbian SuperLiga. He failed to receive any playing time in the following two seasons. After the arrival of Robert Prosinečki midway through the 2010–11 season, Bajković became the first-choice goalkeeper. He also played regularly under Slaviša Stojanovič in the title-winning 2013–14 campaign. Subsequently, Bajković left the club following the expiration of his contract.

In September 2014, Bajković signed with Belgian club Lierse on a one-year deal, rejoining his former manager Slaviša Stojanovič. He also played for Azerbaijani club Neftçi in the 2016–17 season, before hanging up his boots.

Statistics

Honours
Red Star Belgrade
 Serbian SuperLiga: 2013–14
 Serbian Cup: 2009–10, 2011–12

References

External links
 
 
 

1985 births
Living people
Sportspeople from Cetinje
Association football goalkeepers
Serbia and Montenegro footballers
Montenegrin footballers
FK Lovćen players
Red Star Belgrade footballers
FK Jedinstvo Ub players
FK Rad players
FK Smederevo players
FK Srem players
Lierse S.K. players
Neftçi PFK players
Second League of Serbia and Montenegro players
First League of Serbia and Montenegro players
Serbian First League players
Serbian SuperLiga players
Belgian Pro League players
Azerbaijan Premier League players
Montenegrin expatriate footballers
Expatriate footballers in Serbia
Montenegrin expatriate sportspeople in Serbia
Expatriate footballers in Azerbaijan
Montenegrin expatriate sportspeople in Azerbaijan
Expatriate footballers in Belgium
Montenegrin expatriate sportspeople in Belgium
Montenegrin expatriate sportspeople in Turkey